Harold Green may refer to:

 Harold Green (American football) (born 1968), American football player
 Harold Leavenworth Green (1892–1951), chairman and founder of the H.L. Green Company five and dime store chain
 Harold Green (character), on The Red Green Show, played by Patrick McKenna

See also
 Harold Greene (disambiguation)
 Harry Green (disambiguation)
 Green (surname)